HPF may refer to:
 High-pass filter
 High Performance Fortran
 High-power field, in microscopy
 Hindustan Photo Films, an Indian film manufacturer
 Historic Preservation Fund, in the United States
 Hours post fertilization, a metric for developmental biology
 Human Proteome Folding Project